Yan Yikuan (Chinese: 严屹宽; born 24 January 1979), formerly known as Yan Kuan (Chinese: 严宽) and also known as Kevin Yan, is a Chinese actor and singer. He is best known for his roles in the television series Taiji Prodigy (2002), The Prince of Qin, Li Shimin (2005), The Last Princess (2008), All Men Are Brothers & The Glamorous Imperial Concubine (2011), Mazu (2012), Heroes in Sui and Tang Dynasties (2013), The Three Heroes and Five Gallants (2016) and Treasure Raiders (2016).

Career
Yan graduated from the acting department of Shanghai Theatre Academy in 2001 and joined National Theatre Company of China. He made his debut in the film First Opium War (1997), where he had a minor role. However due to his appearance not fitting the role, his scenes were later cut.

Yan first gained attention with his appearance in wuxia drama Taiji Prodigy and later historical drama The Prince of Qin, Li Shimin. Thereafter, he starred in a series of well-received period dramas, such as Big Shot and Golden Years, which gained him considerable recognition and earned him the title of "Most Handsome Ancient Man" in China. He also starred in The Last Princess which yield high audience following during its run and led to a surge in popularity for Yan.

Yan achieved breakthrough in 2011; his performance in the television adaptation of Water Margin, All Men Are Brothers and historical palace drama The Glamorous Imperial Concubine garnered much attention for Yan, who later won the Acting Idol award at the China TV Drama Awards. Yan also starred alongside Liu Tao in mythology drama Mazu, which was a hit in China.

Yan then headlined historical drama Heroes in Sui and Tang Dynasties (2013), which marked the turning point of his career. The series earned both positive reviews and high ratings. After the series was broadcast in Taiwan, Yan experienced a surge in popularity in the region. His other notable appearances were in The Three Heroes and Five Gallants (based on The Seven Heroes and Five Gallants) and Treasure Raiders (based on Gu Long's novel of the same name). In 2016, Yan starred alongside an ensemble cast in Guo Jingming's epic fantasy film L.O.R.D: Legend of Ravaging Dynasties. In 2017, Yan co-starred in the fantasy romance film Once Upon a Time, portraying Demon Lord Qing Cang. He has also been cast in the historical drama The Legend of Ba Qing co-starring Fan Bingbing''.

Personal life
Yan and his girlfriend of five years, actress Sunny Du held their long-awaited wedding in Bali, Indonesia on the evening of 22 March 2014. The couple were engaged for four months before registering for marriage last August.

Yan Kuan changed his name to Yan Yikuan in 2013.

Filmography

Film

Television series

Discography

Albums

Singles

Awards and nominations

References

External links
  Yan Yikuan's official weibo
 

Male actors from Shanghai
Living people
1979 births
Singers from Shanghai
Shanghai Theatre Academy alumni
Chinese male television actors
Chinese male film actors
21st-century Chinese male actors
21st-century Chinese male singers